Ibon is a male given name in the Basque language. It may refer to:

People
Ibon Areso (born 1944), Spanish politician
Ibon Begoña (born 1973), Spanish football player and coach
Ibón Gutiérrez (born 1984), Spanish football player
Ibon Koteron (born 1967), Spanish musician 
Ibon Navarro (born 1976), Spanish basketball coach
Ibon Urbieta (born 1967), Spanish rower

Other uses
Ibón, the Aragonese term for a small mountain lake
Ibon, common name for a gun in southwest Nigeria, taken from the Yoruba language
IBON Foundation, a Filipino nonprofit
The cinnamon ibon, a type of bird